The Archdiocese of Tiranë–Durrës is a Latin Metropolitan archdiocese in Albania.

Its cathedral episcopal see is Katedrale e Shën Palit, in the city of Tiranë, where also stands the former Cathedral: Kisha e Zemrës së Shenjtë të Jezusit Kisha e Zemrës së Shenjtë të Jezusit.

History 
 In 1205, during the aftermath of the Fourth Crusade, coastal regions of Byzantine Theme of Dyrrhachium (including Durrës) were conquered by the Republic of Venice, and organized as the Duchy of Durazzo. 
 In 1209, Metropolitan Archdiocese of Durrës (Latin Rite) was established by pope Innocent III.
 Demoted circa 1400? as Archdiocese of Durrës
 In 1640, it gained territories from the suppressed Diocese of Arbano and from the Diocese of Stephaniacum
 On 10 March 1926 it lost territory to the Metropolitan Archdiocese of Corfu–Zakynthos–Kefalonia (in Ionian insular Greece)
 On 11 November 1939 it lost some territory (southern regions) to the Apostolic Administration of Southern Albania.
 Renamed on 23 December 1992 to Archdiocese of Durrës–Tiranë
 On 7 December 1996, it lost territory to a suffragan, the Rrëshen
 25 January 2005: Promoted as Metropolitan Archdiocese of Tiranë–Durrës
 Pope Francis visited the Diocese in September 2014.

Province 
Initial ecclesiastical province, centered in Durrës, was formed in the aftermath of the Fourth Crusade, when coastal regions of Byzantine Theme of Dyrrhachium were conquered by the Republic of Venice, and organized as the Duchy of Durazzo. In 1209, pope Innocent III confirmed Manfredo as Archbishop of Durrës (Latin Rite), with jurisdiction over the region, thus establishing the Roman Catholic Metropolitan Province of Durrës, that was later reorganized.

Modern ecclesiastical province was created in 2005, and includes the Metropolitan's own Archdiocese and the following Suffragan sees :
 Roman Catholic Diocese of Rrëshen
 Apostolic Administration of Southern Albania (a type of pre-diocesan jurisdiction usually left exempt)

Episcopal ordinaries
(all Roman Rite)

Metropolitan Archbishops of Durrës
 incomplete
 Manfredo (1209-1211)
 ...
 Antonio (1296?–1301?)
 Pietro (1303?–1304?)
 Matteo (1320? – death 1334?)
 Pietro da Geronsa, Friars Minor (O.F.M.) (1340.03.23 – ?)
 Angelo, O.F.M. (1344 – ?)
 Antonio da Alessandria, O.F.M. (1349.05.25 – ?), previously Titular Archbishop of Hierapolis (1346.07.31 – 1349.05.25)
 Demetrio (1363.12.20 – ?), previously Bishop of Stephaniacum (? – 1363.12.20)
 Giovanni (1388.09.28 – ?)
 Stefano da Napoli, Carmelites (O. Carm.) (1394.06.03 – ?)
 Giovanni Bonifacio Panella (1395.05.15 – 1399.05.16; died 1418?), previously Bishop of Ferentino (Italy) (1392.03.08 – 1395.05.15) and Bishop of Sulmona (Italy) (1395–?); later Archbishop-Bishop of Capaccio (Italy) (1399.05.16 – 1405.04.13), Bishop of Muro Lucano (Italy) (1405.04.13 – 1418?)
 Leonardo Piermicheli (1399.06.05 – ?)

Exempt Archbishops of Durrës
 Minore (1403.09.13 – ?), previously Bishop of Suacia (? – 1403.09.13)
 Giovanni di Durazzo, Dominican Order (O.P.) (1412.10.01 – death 1422)
 Nicola di Cosma, O.F.M. (1422.07.06 – ?)
 Giovanni de Monte (1429.10.21 – death 1441?)
 Giacomo da Cortino (1457.01.26 – ?)
 Stefano Birello, Servites (O.S.M.) (1458.03.09 – death 1459)
 Paolo Angelo (1460.05.19 – ?)
 Nicola Barbuti, O.P. (1469.05.05 – ?)
 Marco Cattaneo (1474.11.16 – death 1487.08)
 Martino Firmani (1492.02.18 – 1499.08.06)
 Francesco Quirini (1499.11.27 – death 1505.08.01), previously Bishop of Šibenik (Croatia) (1491 – 1495)
 Nicola Foresio (1505.09.01 – death 1510)
 Gabriele Mascioli Foschi, Augustinians (O.E.S.A.) (1511 – death 1534.10.25)
 Giorgio Stemagu (1535.06.21 – death 1540?)
 Ludovico Bianchi, Conventual Franciscans (O.F.M. Conv.) (1540.04.16 – ?)
 Decio Carafa (1608? – 1613.01.07), previously Titular Archbishop of Damascus (1606.05.17 – 1611.08.17), Apostolic Nuncio (papal ambassador) to Spain (1607.05.22 – 1611.08); created Cardinal-Priest of S. Lorenzo in Panisperna (1612.05.07 – 1612.06.18), transferred Cardinal-Priest of Ss. Giovanni e Paolo (1612.06.18 – 1626.01.23), later Metropolitan Archbishop of Napoli (Italy) (1613.01.07 – 1626.01.23), Apostolic Nuncio to Austria-Hungary (1621 – death 1626.01.23)
 Antonio Provana (1622.07.21 – 1632.01.07), later Metropolitan Archbishop of Torino (Italy) (1632.01.07 – death 1640.07.25)
 Girolamo Greco (1634 – ?)
 Marcus Scura, O.F.M. (1640.09.10 – death 1656.04.27), previously Bishop of Arbano (1635.10.01 – death 1640.09.10)
 Nicola Carpegna (1657.08.27 – death 1670)
 Gerardo Galata (1670.05.19 – death 1696?)
Apostolic Administrator Nicola Vladagni (1698.06.27 – 1700.03.30), while Bishop of Lezhë (Albania) (1692.10.15 – 1705?)
 Pietro Zumi (1700.03.30 – death 1720)
 Pietro Scurra (1720.09.30 – death 1737), previously Bishop of Pult (Albania) (1719.05.15 – 1720.09.30)
 Giovanni Galata (1739.01.26 – death 1752), previously Bishop of Sapë (Albania) (1720.09.30 – 1728.11.15) and Apostolic Administrator of Pult (Albania) (1720.12.23 – 1728.11.15), Bishop of Lezhë (Albania) (1728.11.15 – 1739.01.26)
 Nicolò Angelo Radovani (1752.12.18 – death 1774?)
 Tommaso Mariagni (1774.06.27 – death 1808?)
 Paul Galata (1808 – death 1836.08.12), succeeding as former Coadjutor Archbishop of Durrës (1803.09.09 – 1808) &  Titular Bishop of Tænarum (1803.09.09 – 1808)
 Nicola Bianchi (1838.06.26 – death 1843.05.17)
 Giorgio Labella, O.F.M. (1844.11.26 – death 1847.06.04)
 Raffaele d’Ambrosio, O.F.M. (1847.12.17 – 1893.07.14), later Titular Archbishop of Acrida (1893.07.14 – ?)
 Primo Bianchi (1893.07.17 – 1922), later Titular Archbishop of Cassiope (see) (1922.06.12 – death 1927.08.19)
 Francesco Melchiori, O.F.M. (1922.05.22 – death 1928), succeeding as former Coadjutor Archbishop of Durrës (1921.09.28 – 1922.05.22) &  Titular Archbishop of Modon (1921.09.28 – 1922.05.22)
 Pietro Gjura (1929.05.15 – death 1939.07.09)
 Vinçenc Prennushi, O.F.M. (1940.06.26 – death 1949.03.19), also Apostolic Administrator of Southern Albania of the Albanese (Albania) (1946 – 1949.03.19); previously Bishop of Sapë (Albania) (1936.01.27 – 1940.06.26)
Apostolic Administrator Nikollë Troshani ((1958.04.18 – 1992), Titular Bishop of Cisamus (1958.04.18 – death 1994.05.25), no other office

Archbishop of Durrës–Tiranë
 Archbishop Rrok Mirdita (1992.12.25 – 2005.01.25 see below), also President of Episcopal Conference of Albania (1997 – 2000)

Metropolitan Archbishops of Tiranë-Durrës
 Archbishop Rrok Mirdita (see above 2005.01.25 – death 2015.12.07), also President of Episcopal Conference of Albania (2006 – 2012.09)
 Archbishop George Anthony Frendo, O.P. (2016.12.03 – 2021.11.30)
 Archbishop Arjan Dodaj, (2021.11.30 - present)

See also 
 Catholic Church in Albania
 Kingdom of Albania (medieval)
 Albanian Orthodox Archbishopric of Tiranë-Durrës

References

Sources

External links
 Catholic Encyclopedia: Archdiocese of Durazzo (Dyrrachiensis)

Roman Catholic dioceses in Albania
Dioceses established in the 14th century
Religion in Tirana
 
Roman Catholic ecclesiastical provinces in Albania